Joannicius, also Ioannikios, Joanikije, Ioannikiy, Anikiy, Ioannykiy, Onykiy, may refer to:

 Joannicius the Great, 8th-century Byzantine Christian saint
 Joannicius of Ochrid, Archbishop of Ohrid (13th century)
 Joanikije I, Archbishop of the Serbian Orthodox Church 1272–1276
 Joanikije II, first Serbian Patriarch, Wonderworker, reigned 1346-1354
 Joanikije II, Metropolitan of Montenegro, since 2021
 Joannicius of Devič, died 1430
 Patriarch Joannicius I of Constantinople, reigned 1524–1525
 Patriarch Joannicius II of Constantinople, reigned four times in 1646–1656
 Patriarch Joannicius III of Constantinople, reigned 1761–1763; Patriarch of the Serbs 1739–1746
 Patriarch Joannicius of Alexandria, Greek Patriarch of Alexandria 1645–1657
 Joannicius, Metropolitan of Moscow, reigned 1882-1891
 Joanikije Lipovac, Metropolitan of Montenegro, died 1945